is a lighthouse on the Kiku Peninsula in Moji-ku, Kitakyūshū in Fukuoka Prefecture, Japan.

See also

 List of lighthouses in Japan

Notes

Lighthouses completed in 1871
Lighthouses in Japan
Buildings and structures in Fukuoka Prefecture